Nicholas Hammond may refer to:

 Nicholas Hammond (cricketer) (born 1998), English cricketer
 N. G. L. Hammond (1907–2001), a British historian
 Nicholas Hammond (ornithologist), from England
 Nicholas Hammond (born 1950), an American actor
 Nick Hammond (born 1967), British football player
 Nicolas Hammond (born 1964), British author, Rubik's Cube expert